Brian Custer (born December 7, 1970) is an American sports broadcaster who serves as the host for Showtime Championship Boxing. In July 2021, Custer joined ESPN as the host of SportsCenter and a play-by-play announcer on ESPN College Football, ESPN College Basketball and NBA on ESPN.

He worked for Fox Sports as a play-by-play announcer doing select NFL games as well as the BIG3, NCAA football and NCAA basketball. He was also a sportscaster for SportsNet New York.

References

Living people
1970 births
Fox Sports announcers
African-American sports announcers
American sports announcers
Boxing commentators
National Football League announcers
College football announcers
College basketball announcers in the United States